State Route 39 (SR 39) is a  state highway that travels south-to-north through portions of Seminole, Miller, Early, Clay, Quitman, and Stewart counties in the southwestern part of the U.S. state of Georgia. The route proceeds north from its southern terminus along the shore of Lake Seminole in southern Seminole County to a point just southwest of Omaha, where it travels in an easterly direction until it meets its northern terminus, an intersection with US 27/SR 1 in a rural south of the unincorporated community of Louvale.

Route description

Seminole and Miller counties
SR 39 begins at a parking lot for a boat ramp along the shore of Lake Seminole, south of Seminole State Park in southern Seminole County. SR 39 travels northwest and west onto Mildred Cummings Road. It then turns to the north and skirts along the western edge of the park, intersecting SR 253 (Bainbridge Highway) on its northwestern corner. The route continues to the north, intersecting the northern terminus of SR 374. Approaching Donalsonville from the south, it skirts along the western edge of the Donalsonville Country Club, intersects SR 285, passes the Donalsonville Municipal Airport and Seminole County Middle/High School. In Donalsonville proper, adjacent to Davis Park, is an intersection with SR 91 (Marianna Highway). The two highways begin a concurrency through town. About five blocks to the north is an intersection with US 84/SR 38 (3rd Street). Less than  after crossing over a CSX railway line, the two routes diverge, with SR 39 heading northwest on West Crawford Street. Before leaving town, it curves to a more north-northwestern routing. Approximately  later, it enters Miller County. Farther to the north, at the intersection with Moulton Road and Shingler Road, the highway heads to the west and enters Early County.

Early County
SR 39 resumes its northward routing just northwest of Killarney. In Jones Crossroads is an intersection with SR 273 (Papermill Highway).. After curving to the north-northeast, the route enters Lucile, where it has a short segment on the Early–Miller county line. After it re-emerges into Early County, it enters Blakely. In Blakely, SR 39 passes southwest of the Town & Country Golf Course and turns right onto Cedar Springs Road (part of former SR 363). One block later, it intersects US 27 Business/SR 1 Business (South Main Street). The three highways travel concurrently to the north through downtown. On the way, they pass east of Blakely Cemetery and intersect SR 62 (Columbia Street), which joins the concurrency. The four highways travel around the city square, with SR 62 departing the concurrency on the east side of the square. US 27 Business/SR 1 Business/SR 39 continue to the north. At the intersection with SR 62 Bypass (Martin Luther King Jr. Boulevard), SR 39 turns left and travels concurrent with SR 62 Bypass into the northwestern part of the city. At the intersection with Fort Gaines Street, SR 39 departs to the northwest and leaves the city. Just before Grimsley Mills Road, it curves to the north-northwest, and after Singletary Road, it curves back to the northwest. Just before leaving the county, SR 39 curves to a nearly due north routing. A short distance later, the road enters Clay County.

Clay, Quitman, and Stewart counties
SR 39 continues to the north, and curves to the northwest, before entering Fort Gaines, where it curves to a northward routing and is briefly concurrent with SR 37. North of Fort Gaines, SR 39 intersects the western terminus of SR 266 (Coleman Road) and runs along the eastern shore of Walter F. George Lake, and passes just east of George T. Bagby State Park. It curves to the northwest and crosses over Pataula Creek and passes northeast of Pataula Creek Park. SR 39 curves back to the north and enters Quitman County. It curves to the north-northeast and intersects US 82/SR 50. The three highways travel concurrently to the northwest into Georgetown. In town is an intersection with the southern terminus of SR 27. At this intersection, SR 27/SR 39 travel to the northeast. Then, SR 39 departs to the north-northeast, running parallel to the Chattahoochee River and entering Stewart County. After curving to a nearly due north routing, the route intersects the western terminus of SR 39 Connector just south of Florence Marina State Park. SR 39 begins a gradual curve to the north-northeast. Just southwest of Omaha, the route intersects the eastern terminus of SR 39 Spur and makes a nearly 90-degree turn to the east. It passes through Omaha and continues to the east. After crossing over a CSX railway line, it continues to the east until it meets its northern terminus, an intersection with US 27/SR 1 in a rural area south of the unincorporated community of Louvale.

National Highway System
The following portions of SR 39 that is included as part of the National Highway System, a system of routes determined to be the most important for the nation's economy, mobility, and defense
From the southern end of the US 27 Bus./SR 1 Bus. to the northern end of the SR 62 Byp. cconcurrency in Blakely.
The brief concurrency with US 82/SR 50 from a point southeast of Georgetown to the central part of the city

History

The portion of SR 39 north of Georgetown was formerly SR 375. However, it was renumbered as an extension of SR 39 after just a few months.

Major intersections

Special routes

Connector route

State Route 39 Connector (SR 39 Connector) is a  connector route that travels totally within Stewart County. As its designation implies, it connects the SR 39 mainline near Florence Marina State Park with US 27/SR 1 and SR 1 Connector in Lumpkin. The route passes through Providence Canyon State Park.

SR 39 Connector begins at an intersection with the SR 39 mainline southeast of Florence Marina State Park, south-southwest of Omaha. It travels to the southeast, crossing over a northeastern arm of the Walter F. George Lake. Then, it curves to an eastern orientation and travels through Providence Canyon State Park. The route then travels to the east-southeast. Just before entering the city limits of Lumpkin, it intersects US 27/SR 1 (Martha Berry Highway). At its intersection with Florence Street, the connector curves to the east and meets its eastern terminus, an intersection with SR 1 Connector (Chestnut Street).

SR 39 Connector is not part of the National Highway System, a system of roadways important to the nation's economy, defense, and mobility.

Spur route

State Route 39 Spur (SR 39 Spur) is a  spur route that travels from the Alabama state line to the SR 39 mainline southwest of Omaha. West of the Chattahoochee River, at the Alabama state line, the roadway becomes known as Alabama State Route 208.

SR 39 Spur is not part of the National Highway System, a system of roadways important to the nation's economy, defense, and mobility.

See also

References

External links

039
Transportation in Seminole County, Georgia
Transportation in Miller County, Georgia
Transportation in Early County, Georgia
Transportation in Clay County, Georgia
Transportation in Quitman County, Georgia
Transportation in Stewart County, Georgia